The Judgement of Paris refers to any of the several paintings of the Judgement of Paris produced by Peter Paul Rubens, though he did not match the 22 depictions of the subject attributed to Lucas Cranach the Elder.  The large versions of 1636 in London and 1639 in Madrid are among the best known. These both show Rubens' version of idealised feminine beauty, with the goddesses Aphrodite, Athena and Hera on one side and Paris accompanied by Hermes on the other. The 1636 version has a depiction of Cupid at the far left and Alecto above the goddesses, whilst the 1639 version adds a Cupid between Hera (far right) and Aphrodite (centre).

1636 version
This version follows the story as narrated in Lucian's 'Judgement of the Goddesses'. It shows the award of the golden apple, though alterations show Rubens first painted an earlier point in the story, when the goddesses are ordered to undress by Mercury. It was bought for the National Gallery in London in 1844.

1638 version
Painted in 1638 or 1639, this version is now in the Prado and was completed shortly before his death while he was ill with gout. It was commissioned by Philip IV of Spain's brother Cardinal-Infante Ferdinand of Austria and on Ferdinand's death moved to the Spanish royal collection. In 1788 Charles III of Spain decided it was immodest and ordered it to be burned, but he died before that order could be carried out.

Other versions

References

Mythological paintings by Peter Paul Rubens
Paintings depicting Greek myths
Judgment of Paris
Nude art
Paintings by Peter Paul Rubens in the National Gallery, London
Birds in art
Dogs in art
Paintings of Venus